The Second Nawaz Sharif provincial cabinet was formed by Nawaz Sharif in November 1988 to begin a new government following the 1988 Pakistani general election. It was dissolved on 6 August 1990.

Cabinet

Ministers
Following were the members of the cabinet:
 Al-Haj Rana Phool Muhammad Khan (PP-149 – Kasur) — Cooperatives
 Ch Akhtar Ali (PP-104 – Sialkot) — Communication and Works– IJI
 Ch Muhammad Iqbal (PP-85 – Gujranwala) — Information
 Ch Muhammad Riaz (PP-10 – Rawalpindi) — Social Welfare– IJI
 Ch Parvez Elahi (PP-94 – Gujrat) — Local Government & Rural Development
 Dr Muhammad Afzal Eiaz (PP-1 – Rawalpindi) — Transport– IJI
 Makhdoom Ali Raza Shah (PP-72 – Toba Tek Singh) – PPP
 Shah Mahmood Qureshi (PP-166 – Multan) — Planning and Development
 Malik Ghulam Muhammad Noor Rabbani Khar (PP-212 – Muzaffargarh) — Wildlife and Fisheries
 Malik Salim Iqbal (PP-19 – Chakwal) — Health
 Khan Gul Hamid Khan Rokhri (PP-37 – Mianwali) — Food – IJI
 Muhammad Arshad Khan Lodhi (PP-182 – Sahiwal) — Revenue
 Saeed Ahmad Khan Manais (PP-193 – Vehari) — Agriculture– IJI
 Saeed Akbar Khan (PP-40 – Bhakkar) — Livestock and Dairy Development
 Qari Saeed-ur-Rehman (PP-13 – Attock) — Zakat & Ushr– IJI
 Raja Ashfaq Sarwar Khan (PP-8 – Rawalpindi) — Labour– IJI
 Sardar Amjad Hameed Khan Dasti (PP-211 – Muzaffargarh) — Finance
 Sardar Muhammad Arif Nakai (PP-150 – Kasur) — Industries and Mineral Development
 Sardar Nasrullah Khan Dreshak (PP-205 – Rajanpur) — Irrigation/Law & Parliamentary Affairs– IJI
 Zulfiqar Ali Khan Khosa (PP-201 – D.G.Khan) — Education, Finance, IJI
 Syed Afzaal Ali Shah (PP-158 – Okara) — Housing, Physical and Environmental Planning
 Syed Ahmad Mahmood (PP-238 – Rahim Yar Khan) — Excise & Taxation– IND

References

Nawaz Sharif
1988 establishments in Pakistan
Cabinets established in 1988
1980s in Pakistan
1980s in politics
Cabinets disestablished in 1990
1990 disestablishments in Pakistan
Punjab, Pakistan ministries